Marcin Komorowski (born 17 April 1984) is a Polish former footballer.

Career
In June 2014, Komorowski signed a new two-year contract with FC Terek Grozny.

International
He made his first appearance for the Polish national team in a friendly against Serbia on 14 December 2008.

International goals

References

External links
 
 National team stats 
 

1984 births
Living people
Poland international footballers
Polish expatriate footballers
Stal Głowno players
GKS Bełchatów players
ŁKS Łódź players
Zagłębie Sosnowiec players
Legia Warsaw players
Ekstraklasa players
Polonia Bytom players
Polish footballers
Association football defenders
RKS Radomsko players
FC Akhmat Grozny players
Expatriate footballers in Russia
Russian Premier League players
People from Pabianice
Sportspeople from Łódź Voivodeship